Cobina Wright, Sr.  (born Esther Ellen Cobb, September 20, 1887 – April 9, 1970) was an American opera singer and actress who appeared in The Razor's Edge (1946). She gained later fame as a hostess and a syndicated gossip columnist. Wright was also known as Esther Cobb, Esther Johnson, and Esther Cobina.

Biography
She was born on September 20, 1887, in Lakeview, Oregon to Benjamin M. Cobb and Della Holmes (1861—1943).

She married and divorced twice. Her first husband, whom she married in 1912, was American novelist Owen Johnson; she was his second wife, and they divorced in 1917. Her second husband was William May Wright, a stockbroker, by whom she had one child, a daughter, Cobina Carolyn Wright (aka Cobina Wright Jr.), (1921—2011), briefly a movie actress. the Wrights were divorced in 1935.

In the early part of the 20th century, she was a coloratura soprano, using the stage name Esther Cobina. She had studied singing in California, under voice teacher Nettie Snyder, and in Germany, where she initially pursued her career on stage. During World War I, she performed for French and American troops in Europe. She later made her American opera debut at Carnegie Hall in 1924.

She died in Los Angeles, California in 1970.

Legacy
Wright was the author of a memoir called I Never Grew Up (Prentice-Hall, 1952).

Filmography

References

External links

1887 births
1970 deaths
Actresses from Oregon
American socialites
American film actresses
American stage actresses
American operatic sopranos
People from Lakeview, Oregon
20th-century American actresses
Singers from Oregon
20th-century American singers
20th-century American women singers
Classical musicians from Oregon